Brajrajnagar railway station is a railway station on the South East Central Railway network in the state of Odisha, India. It serves Brajrajnagar town. Its code is BRJN. It has three platforms. Passenger, Express and Superfast trains halt at Brajrajnagar railway station.

Trains

 Howrah–Ahmedabad Superfast Express
 Hirakud Superfast Express
 Kalinga Utkal Express
 Puri–Jodhpur Express
 Howrah–Mumbai Mail
 Azad Hind Express
 South Bihar Express

See also
 Jharsuguda district

References

Railway stations in Jharsuguda district
Bilaspur railway division